Gourdonia is a trilobite in the order Phacopida (family Acastidae), that existed during the middle Devonian in what is now France. It was described by Pillet in 1954, and the type species is Gourdonia gourdoni, which was originally described under the genus Dalmanites by Barrois in 1883. The generic name is derived from the species epithet. The type locality was the Cathervielle Shale in the Pyrenees mountains.

References

External links
 Gourdonia at the Paleobiology Database

Acastidae
Fossil taxa described in 1954
Devonian trilobites of Europe
Fossils of France